The 2019 Philippine Basketball Association (PBA) Commissioner's Cup Finals was the best-of-7 championship series of the 2019 PBA Commissioner's Cup, and the conclusion of the conference's playoffs. The San Miguel Beermen and the TNT KaTropa competed for the 19th Commissioner's Cup championship and the 126th overall championship contested by the league.

The Beermen ties the Barangay Ginebra Kings to become the second 7th seed team and the lowest seed to win a PBA championship since Barangay Ginebra did it in the 2004 PBA Fiesta Conference.

Background

Road to the finals

Head-to-head matchup

Series summary

Game summaries

Game 1

Game 2

Game 3

Game 4

Game 5

Game 6

Rosters

{| class="toccolours" style="font-size: 95%; width: 100%;"
|-
! colspan="2" style="background-color: #; color: #; text-align: center;" | San Miguel Beermen 2019 PBA Commissioner's Cup roster
|- style="background-color:#; color: #; text-align: center;"
! Players !! Coaches
|-
| valign="top" |
{| class="sortable" style="background:transparent; margin:0px; width:100%;"
! Pos. !! # !! POB !! Name !! Height !! Weight !! !! College
|-

{| class="toccolours" style="font-size: 95%; width: 100%;"
|-
! colspan="2" style="background-color: #; color: #; text-align: center;" | TNT KaTropa 2019 PBA Commissioner's Cup roster
|- style="background-color:#; color: #; text-align: center;"
! Players !! Coaches
|-
| valign="top" |
{| class="sortable" style="background:transparent; margin:0px; width:100%;"
! Pos. !! # !! POB !! Name !! Height !! Weight !! !! College
|-

Broadcast notes
The Philippine Cup Finals will be aired on TV5 with simulcasts on PBA Rush (both in standard and high definition). 5's radio arm, Radyo5 will provide the radio play-by-play coverage.

ESPN5 will also provide online livestreaming via their official YouTube account using the TV5 feed.

The PBA Rush broadcast will provide English-language coverage of the Finals.

Additional Game 6 crew:
Trophy presentation: James Velazquez
Dugout celebration interviewer: Lyn Olavario

References

External links
PBA official website

2019
2019 PBA season
TNT Tropang Giga games
San Miguel Beermen games
PBA Commissioner's Cup Finals